Clugston is a surname. People with the surname include:

 Beatrice Clugston (1827–1888), Scottish philanthropist
 Chynna Clugston Flores (born 1975), American comic book creator
 Kate Clugston (1892–1985), playwright, poet and teacher
 Kathy Clugston (born 1969), Northern Irish newsreader and continuity announcer
 Lin Clugston, (1908–1993), British amateur cricketer

Other uses
 Clugston Group, a British company